Tuztaşı can refer to:

 Tuztaşı, Ayvacık
 Tuztaşı, Narman